Lee Jong-min is a Korean name consisting of the family name Lee and the given name Jong-min. It may refer to:

 Lee Jong-min (swimmer) (born 1982)
 Lee Jong-min (footballer, born 1983)
 Lee Jong-min (footballer, born 1987)
 Lee Jong-min (tennis) (born 1977)
 Lee Jong-min (born 1988), birth name of South Korean singer Babylon